Surabaya ( or ;) is the capital city of the Indonesian province of East Java and the second-largest city in Indonesia, after Jakarta. Located on the northeastern border of Java island, on the Madura Strait, it is one of the earliest port cities in Southeast Asia. According to the National Development Planning Agency, Surabaya is one of the four main central cities of Indonesia, alongside Jakarta, Medan, and Makassar. The city has a population of 2.87 million within its city limits at the 2020 census and 9.5 million in the extended Surabaya metropolitan area, making it the second-largest metropolitan area in Indonesia.

The city was settled in the 10th century by the Kingdom of Janggala, one of the two Javanese kingdoms that was formed in 1045 when Airlangga abdicated his throne in favor of his two sons. In the late 15th and 16th centuries, Surabaya grew to be a duchy, a major political and military power as well as a port in eastern Java, probably under the Majapahit empire.

At that time, Surabaya was already a major trading port, owing to its location on the River Brantas delta and the trade route between Malacca and the Spice Islands via the Java Sea. During the decline of Majapahit, the lord of Surabaya resisted the rise of the Demak Sultanate and only submitted to its rule in 1530. Surabaya became independent after the death of Sultan Trenggana of Demak in 1546.

From the 18th century until the mid-20th century, Surabaya was the largest city in the Dutch East Indies, and the center of trading in the Indonesian archipelago, which was then a competitor to Shanghai and Hong Kong.

The city is known as Kota Pahlawan (the city of heroes) due to the importance of the Battle of Surabaya during the Indonesian National Revolution. The city is one of the important financial, commercial, industrial, transportation, and entertainment hubs of the archipelago, arguably second only to Jakarta, and the Port of Tanjung Perak is Indonesia's second-busiest seaport located on northern Surabaya. The city is also known for being one of the cleanest and greenest in Indonesia.

Surabaya has been one of the most important and busiest trading city ports in Asia. Principal exports from the port include sugar, tobacco, and coffee. Its rich history as a trading port has led to a strong financial infrastructure with modern economic institutions such as banks, insurance, and sound export-import companies. The economy is influenced by the recent growth in international industries and the completion of the Suramadu Bridge. The high potential and economic activities make the city an attractive destination to foreign investors.
The city is home to a large shipyard and numerous specialized naval schools. The Bank of Indonesia has also made plans for Surabaya to be the Islamic financial center of Indonesia.

Etymology 

Surabaya, from the Javanese "", means "bravely facing danger"; originally from the union of Pali words "sura", referring to the "Asura" (Buddhism beliefs), and "bhaya", referring to "fear", "perils" or "danger". This name for Surabaya alludes to a prophecy of Jayabaya, a 12th-century psychic king of Kediri Kingdom, whose name means "conquering the fear or perils" derived from the Pali words "Jaya" or "Vijaya" (victory or conqueror) and "bhaya" (fear, perils or danger). Jayabaya foresaw a fight between a giant white shark and a giant white crocodile taking place in the area.

The event is sometimes interpreted as foretelling the Mongol invasion of Java, a major conflict between the forces of Kublai Khan, Mongol ruler of China, and those of Raden Wijaya's Majapahit on 31 May 1293, which is now considered the date of the city's founding.

The two animals are now used as the city's symbol, with the two facing and circling each other, as depicted in a statue appropriately located near the entrance to the city zoo.

Some people consider Jayabaya's prophecy as being about the great war between native Surabayan people and foreign invaders at the start of the war of independence in 1945. Another story tells of two heroes who fought each other to be the king of the city. The two heroes were named Sura and Baya. These folk etymologies, though embraced enthusiastically by its people and city leaders, are unverifiable.

History

Early history 
The Kingdom of Janggala was one of the two Javanese kingdoms that were formed in 1045 when Airlangga abdicated the throne the Kingdom of Kahuripan of in favor of his two sons. The earliest historical record of Surabaya was in the 1225 book Zhu fan zhi written by Zhao Rugua, in which it was called Jung-ya-lu. The name Janggala is derived from the name "Hujung Galuh" (Old Javanese lit: "Cape Diamond" or "Cape Gemstone"), or "Jung-ya-lu" according to Chinese sources. Hujung Galuh was located on the estuary of Brantas River and today is part of modern Surabaya city and Sidoarjo Regency.

By the 14th and 15th centuries, Surabaya was one of the Majapahit ports or coastal settlements, together with Tuban, Gresik, and Hujung Galuh (Sidoarjo). Ma Huan documented the early 15th-century visit of Zheng He's treasure ships in his 1433 book Yingya Shenglan: "after travelling south for more than 20 li, the ship reached Sulumayi, whose foreign name is Surabaya. At the estuary, the outflowing water is fresh".

Ma Huan visited Java during Zheng He's fourth expedition in 1413, during the reign of Majapahit king Wikramawardhana. He describes his travel to the Majapahit capital. He first arrived at the port of Tu-pan (Tuban) where he saw large numbers of Chinese settlers migrated from Guangdong and Zhangzhou. Then, he sailed east to the thriving new trading town of Ko-erh-hsi (Gresik), Su-pa-erh-ya (Surabaya), and then sailing inland into the river by smaller boat to the southwest until he reached the Brantas river port of Chang-ku (Changgu). Continuing to travel by land to the southwest, he arrived in Man-che-po-I (Majapahit), where the Javanese king stayed.

Pre-colonial era 

The Surabaya area was once the main gatewai to the capital of the Majapahit Kingdom from the sea, at the mouth of Kali Mas river. The anniversary of the city of Surabaya was set on May 31, 1293, Commemorating the victory of the Majapahit led by Raden Wijaya against the Mongol invasion. Mongol troops who came from the sea were described as SURA (sharks / brave) and Raden Wijaya's troops who came from the land were described as BAYA (crocodiles / danger), literally translating to brave to face the dangers that come threatening. So the day of victory is commemorated as the anniversary of Surabaya.

By the late 15th century, Islam began to take its root in Surabaya. The settlement of Ampel , located around Ampel Mosque in today's Ampel subdistrict, Semampir district, north Surabaya, was established by Islamic proselytiser Sunan Ampel.

In the late 15th and 16th centuries, Surabaya grew to a duchy, a major political and military power in eastern Java. The Portuguese writer Tomé Pires mentioned that a Muslim lord was in power in Surabaya in 1513, though likely still a vassal of the Hindu–Buddhist Majapahit. By that time, Surabaya was already a major trading port, owing to its location on the Brantas River delta and the trade route between Malacca and the Spice Islands via the Java Sea. During the decline of Majapahit, the lord of Surabaya resisted the rise of the Demak Sultanate and only submitted to its rule in 1530. Surabaya became independent after the death of Sultan Trenggana of Demak in 1546.

Following the collapse of Demak, Surabaya was conquered by the Mataram Sultanate, under the leadership of Panembahan Senopati in 1598, and invaded by Panembahan Seda ing Krapyak in 1610, An article by the VOC in 1620 described Surabaya as a rich and powerful region.

The Duchy of Surabaya entered conflict with and was later captured by the more powerful Sultanate of Mataram in 1625 under Sultan Agung. It was one of Mataram's fiercest campaigns, in which they had to conquer Surabaya's allies, Sukadana and Madura, and to lay siege to the city, blocking the flow of the Brantas River, Sultan Agung forced Surabaya to surrender. With this conquest, Mataram then controlled most of Java, except the Banten Sultanate and the Dutch settlement of Batavia.

Colonial era 

The expanding Dutch East India Company took the city over from a weakened Mataram in November 1743. In consolidating its rule over Surabaya and, in time, the rest of East Java, the Dutch collaborated with leading regional magnates, including Ngabehi Soero Pernollo (1720–1776), his brother Han Bwee Kong, Kapitein der Chinezen (1727–1778), and his nephew, Han Chan Piet, Majoor der Chinezen (1759–1827), all from the powerful Han family of Lasem.

In the 18th and 19th centuries, Surabaya was largest city in the Dutch East Indies. Becoming a major trading center and hosted the most extensive naval base in the colony. Surabaya also served as the center of Java's plantation economy, industry, supported by its natural harbor.

During the Dutch East Indies era, Surabaya was the capital of the Surabaya Residency, whose territory encompasses what is now the Gresik Regency, Sidoarjo, Mojokerto, and Jombang. In 1905, Surabaya received the status of municipality (gemeente). In 1926, Surabaya was designated the capital of the province of East Java. Since then Surabaya developed into the second largest city in the Dutch East Indies after Batavia.

Before 1900, the city center of Surabaya revolved around the Jembatan Merah;. In 1910, a modern port facility was built in Surabaya, now known as Tanjung Perak Harbor. Until the 1920s, new settlements such as Darmo, Gubeng, Fields, and Ketabang grew.

In 1920, a census recorded that Batavia had become the largest city. In 1917, a revolt occurred among the soldiers and sailors of Surabaya, led by the Indies Social Democratic Association. The revolt was firmly crushed, and the insurgents were given harsh sentences.

Independence era 

Japan occupied the city in 1942, as part of the Japanese occupation of the Dutch East Indies, and it was bombed by the Allies in 1944. After the surrender of Japan at the end of World War II, Surabaya was seized by Indonesian nationalists. The young nation soon came into conflict with the British, who had become caretakers of the Dutch colony after the Japanese surrender.

The Battle of Surabaya, started after the Arek-Arek Suroboyo (Teenagers of Surabaya) killed British Brigadier Aubertin Mallaby on 30 October 1945, near Jembatan Merah, allegedly with a stray bullet. The Allies gave an ultimatum to the Republicans inside the city to surrender, but they refused. The ensuing battle, which cost thousands of lives, took place on 10 November, which Indonesians subsequently celebrate as Hari Pahlawan (Heroes' Day). The incident of the red-white flag (the Dutch flag at the top of Yamato Hotel's tower that was torn into the Indonesian red-white flag) by Bung Tomo is also recorded as a heroic feat during the struggle of this city.

The city is known as Kota Pahlawan (the city of heroes) due to the importance of the Battle of Surabaya in galvanising Indonesian and international support for Indonesian independence during the Indonesian National Revolution.

Modern history 

After the independence era, population growth and rapid urbanization forced Surabaya to develop towards the east and west as it is today. The increase in vehicles, the growth of new industries and the proliferation of housing carried out by real estate companies occupying the outskirts of the city have resulted not only traffic jams in the downtown area but also frequently in the suburbs. Surabaya has grown away from a relatively slum city in the late 19th century, into a metropolis in the late 20th century and in the 21st century, become one of the fastest growing metropolitan areas in Southeast Asia. Surabaya also managed to turn into one of the most organized metropolitan cities in Indonesia with the cleanest air quality.

On 13 May 2018, three churches in Surabaya and one apartment complex in the neighboring regency of Sidoarjo were bombed in a series of terrorist attacks initiated by Jamaah Ansharut Daulah, the Southeast Asian branch of ISIS, followed by a bombing on Surabaya Police Department HQ the following day. 28 people were killed, including the assailants. While 57 people were injured; several were in critical condition.

The first confirmed case of COVID-19 in East Java was in Surabaya, on 17 March 2020. In May 2020, Surabaya became the epicenter of the pandemic in Indonesia.

Geography

Topography 

Surabaya is located on the northern coast of East Java province. It is mostly lowlands with a river estuary of Kalimas, one of two branches of the Brantas River. Surabaya city borders Madura Strait in the north and east.
The regencies surrounding Surabaya are:
 Lamongan Regency to the northwest
 Gresik Regency to the west
 Bangkalan Regency to the northeast (on Madura island)
 Sidoarjo Regency to the south
 Mojokerto Regency to the southwest

Like many other large Indonesian metropolises, many residents reside outside the city limits in a
metropolitan area called Gerbangkertosusila.

Climate 
Under the Köppen climate classification system, Surabaya features a tropical wet and dry climate (Aw), with distinct wet and dry seasons. The city's wet season runs from October through May, while the dry season covers the remaining four months. Unlike many cities and regions with a tropical wet and dry climate, average high and low temperatures are very consistent throughout the year, with an average high temperature of around 31 °C and average low temperatures around 23 °C.

Urban forest and parks 

Surabaya is among the cleanest and greenest cities in Indonesia. This can be seen by the urban parks which are equipped with fountains in almost every neighborhood area. These parks include Bungkul Park, Harmoni Park, Pelangi Park, Surya Park, Mundu Park, Undaan Fruit Park, Jayengrono Park, and others. Bungkul Park was awarded the Asian Townscape Award 2013 from the United Nations as the best park in Asia because of its very complete and integrated facilities, starting from the economic area (street food centers), green open area, parks, disability-friendly area, free internet (Wi-Fi), and routine garden maintenance management.

The city of Surabaya is very outstanding in the field of environment. The city has won many awards in the field of environment and city planning both nationally and internationally. These awards have included Adipura, Adipura kencana, Adiwiyata, Wahyu Tata Nugraha, and other green awards, the Adipura Cup, which Surabaya won several times in the 1980s and 1990s, the Adipura Kencana trophy, the cleanest metropolitan city category in the 1990s and in the period of 2010 to 2017, seven consecutive times, as well as the Adipura trophy, plenary in 2016. The city also received several awards from the central government as one of the major cities with the best air quality in Indonesia. Surabaya in 2012 has won the award "City of the Best Participation in the Asia Pacific" by Citynet for the success of the city government and people's participation in managing the environment. Surabaya has also been awarded the ASEAN Environmentally Sustainable City Award or "the city with the best sustainable environmental management in ASEAN" in 2011 and 2014. In 2018, Surabaya won the Lee Kuan Yew City Prize along with Hamburg, Kazan, and Tokyo, on the basis of the ability to maintain and manage villages in the middle of the city with excellent government management and community participation amid the rapidly developing city. Surabaya became the first city in Indonesia to receive this award. On the other hand, however, there are not a few areas in Surabaya that appear less organised, especially in the neighborhoods of Southern and Northern Surabaya. This is the concern of the city government to reorganise the environment of the region.

Government 

The city has its own local government and legislative body. The mayor and members of representatives are locally elected by popular vote for a five-year term. The city government enjoys greater decentralisation of affairs than the provincial body, such as the provision of public schools, public health facilities, and public transportation. The current mayor of the city is Eri Cahyadi, the city's first female mayor is Tri Rismaharini, she has led Surabaya to achieve many regional, national and international awards since her first term began in 2010. In 2012, Surabaya was awarded the "ASEAN Environmentally Sustainable City Award". Besides Mayor and Vice Mayor, there is the Surabaya Municipal People's Representative Council, which is a legislative body of 50 council members directly elected by the people in legislative elections every five years.

The city administration maintains a central command center since 2016, integrating all civic services including Satpol PP, Bakesbangpol and Linmas, Hygiene and Parks Service, Transportation Agency, Public Works Agency of Highways and Extermination, ambulance and fire services. All services can be accessed by dialling 112 number. The city is dubbed as the champion of a smart city in Indonesia and won Indonesia Smart City Index (IKCI) in 2015 and 2018. Surabaya also received an award at the Guangzhou International Award for Urban Innovation in the Online Popular City category and Lee Kuan Yew World City Prize in 2018.

Surabaya is divided into thirty-one kecamatan (districts), and subdivided into 154 kelurahan (urban villages). The districts are grouped into five areas: Central, North, South, East, and West. The districts are listed below with their areas and their populations at the 2010 Census and the 2020 Census.

Demographics 

Surabaya is the second-most populous city in Indonesia, with 2,874,314 inhabitants recorded in the chartered city limits (kota) in the 2020 census. With the extended metropolitan development area called Gerbangkertosusila (derived from Gresik-Bangkalan-Mojokerto-Surabaya-Sidoarjo-Lamongan) adding more than 12 million inhabitants in several cities and around 50 districts spread over noncontiguous urban areas including Gresik, Sidoarjo, Mojokerto, and Pasuruan regencies. The central government of Indonesia recognises only the metropolitan area (Surabaya, Gresik, and Sidoarjo) as Greater Surabaya (Zona Surabaya Raya) with a population of 8,319,229 (2015), making Surabaya now the second-largest metropolitan area in Indonesia. The city is highly urbanised, with industries centralised in the city, and contains slums.  As a leading education center, the city is also home for students from around Indonesia.

Surabaya is an old city that has expanded over time, and its population continues to grow at roughly 2.2% per year. In recent years, more people have moved to Surabaya from nearby suburbs and villages in East Java.

Ethnicity 
Javanese people form the majority in Surabaya, forming around 83 percent out all population, while the Madurese and Chinese are significant minorities, forming around 7 percent respectively, the rest are Arab and other ethnics that are present. Surabaya also has ethnic populations from other parts of Indonesia: Sundanese, Minang, Batak, Banjar, and Balinese. Surabaya is one of the major cities in Indonesia that has a significant population of Middle East people; there are Arabs, especially the Hadhrami people who originate from the Hadhramaut region in Yemen, Armenian people, and Jews.

As one of the educational destinations, Surabaya is also the residence of students from various regions from all over Indonesia, even among them they also form their own community forum, majority from Eastern part of Indonesia such as Papuan, Minahasan, Bugis, Timor people and others. As one of the regional trade centers, many foreigners (expatriates) live in Surabaya, especially in the West Surabaya area, community like Korean and westerners are exist in the city.

Language 
Most citizens speak a dialect of East Javanese called Suroboyoan, a subdialect of the Arekan dialect. A stereotype of this dialect concerns equality and directness in speech. The use of register is less strict than the Central Java dialect. The Suroboyoan dialect is a mixture of both Indonesian and Javanese, also with some significant influence from foreign languages such as Madurese, which has formed a distinctive dialect known as Suroboyoan. The Suroboyoan dialect is actively promoted in local media, such as in local TV shows, radio, newspapers, and traditional dramas called Ludruk. The speakers of Suroboyoan dialect are well known for being proud of their distinctive dialect and consistently maintain it wherever they go.

Religion 

Although around 80% of citizens in Surabaya adhere to Sunni Islam, other major religions include Christianity (Roman Catholicism, Protestantism, and Orthodox), of whom the majority are Roman Catholics. The influence of Hinduism is strong in basic Surabayan culture, but only a minority of the population adheres to Hinduism, mostly among the ethnic Indian and Balinese minorities. Also, a significant population of Chinese Indonesians adhere to Buddhism and Confucianism, and a small community of Dutch Jews follow Judaism.

The city had an influential role as a major Islamic center in Java during the Wali Sanga era. The prominent and honored Islamic figure in Surabaya was Sunan Ampel (Raden Rahmat). His tomb is a sacred religious site in the city and is visited by Surabayans and pilgrims from different parts of Indonesia. The largest Muslim organisation in Indonesia, Nahdlatul Ulama, was established in Surabaya on 26 January 1926. Al-Akbar Mosque is the largest mosque in the city and one of the largest mosque in the world.

Christianity as a whole is mainly practised by Chinese Indonesians, as well as native Javanese, Bataks, and Ambonese who attend either a Roman Catholic or Protestant church. A minority of Javanese worship at the Gereja Kejawen - a syncretic religious movement that combines Christianity with the traditional religion of Java. Around 15 churches are in Surabaya; they vary in size. The Church of the Birth of Our Lady, also known as Gereja Kepanjen, was built in 1815 as the first church in Surabaya and is one of the oldest churches in Indonesia. Graha Bethany Nginden, is a megachurch which is one of the largest churches in Surabaya, Indonesia and Southeast Asia. The main Orthodox Church in Indonesia, St Nikolas Church, is also based in Surabaya. The Orthodox Christian Center Surabaya was opened on 15 October 2008.

Once the major religion in Surabaya and across the archipelago during the Janggala and Majapahit era, Hinduism played a major role in traditional Surabayan culture. Small Hindu communities still exist, most commonly in the eastern sections of the city. Surabaya was the location of the only synagogue in Java, but it rarely obtained a minyan (quorum). The synagogue was demolished in 2013 by unidentified persons while the city council was in the process of registering it as a heritage site. In the years before its demolition, it had been the site of many anti-Israel protests. A Jewish cemetery exists in the city.

Culture 

Javanese culture in Surabaya has distinctive characteristics compared to other regions, the uniqueness of its characteristics which is more egalitarian and open. Surabaya is known to have several distinctive arts, namely:
 Ludruk, a cultural drama performance art that tells daily routine of working-class people.
 Remo Dance, a traditional welcome dance that is generally dedicated to special guests.
 Kidungan, a poetry musicalisation and contains elements of humor.

In addition to the art above, the call culture of arek or rek (a distinctive call from Surabaya) is also a unique characteristic. There are other distinctive calls as well, namely Cak for men and Ning for women. In an effort to preserve culture, Cak & Ning Surabaya is selected once a year, and the selected finalists are tourism ambassadors and icons of the young generation of the city.

Cak Durasim Festival (FCD) is held annually, which is an art festival to preserve the culture of Surabaya and East Java in general. The Cak Durasim Festival is usually held at Cak Durasim Building. There is also the Surabaya Art Festival (FSS) which raises all kinds of art forms such as theatre, dance, music, literary seminars, painting exhibitions. Event organisers usually aside from art groups in Surabaya also come from outside the city. Also enlivened is the screening of movie screens and T-shirt exhibitions. The Surabaya Art Festival is held once a year in June and is usually held at the Youth Hall.

In addition to Javanese culture, there has also been a mixture of various cultures such as from Madura, the Arab world, India, the Malay world, China and Europe. The Surabaya Cross Culture is an annual art and culture festival that show various cultures outside Indonesia.

Economy 

Since the early 1900s, Surabaya has been one of the most important and busiest trading city ports in Asia. Principal exports from the port include sugar, tobacco, and coffee. Its rich history as a trading port has led to a strong financial infrastructure with modern economic institutions such as banks, insurance, and sound export-import companies. The economy is influenced by the recent growth in international industries and the completion of the Suramadu Bridge. The high potential and economic activities make the city an attractive destination to foreign investors.
The city is home to a large shipyard and numerous specialized naval schools. The Bank of Indonesia has also made plans for Surabaya to be the Islamic financial center of Indonesia.

Business 
As the provincial capital, Surabaya has numerous offices and business centers; as a metropolitan city, it became the center of economic, financial, and business activities in East Java and beyond. Also, Surabaya is the second-largest port city in Indonesia after Jakarta.  As a trading center, Surabaya is not only a trade center for East Java, but also facilitates areas in Central Java, Kalimantan, and Eastern Indonesia. Surabaya's strategic location in almost in the center of Indonesia and just south of Asia makes it one of the critical hubs for trading activities in Southeast Asia. It is currently in the process of building high-rise skyscrapers, including apartments, condominiums, and hotels to attract foreign capital. Surabaya and the surrounding area are undergoing the most rapidly growing and the most advanced economic development in Indonesia. The city is also one of the most essential cities in supporting Indonesia's economy.

Most of the population is engaged in services, industry, and trade. Surabaya is a fast-growing trading center. Major industries include shipbuilding, heavy equipment, food processing and agriculture, electronics, home furnishings, and handicrafts. Many major multinational companies are based in Surabaya, such as Sampoerna, Maspion, Wings Group, Unilever Indonesia, Pakuwon Group, Jawa Pos Group, and PAL Indonesia.

Business districts 
The area between Jalan Basuki Rachmat, Jalan Tunjungan, Jalan Embong Malang, and Jalan Bubutan has grown as a business center and has turned into one of the main business and trade activities areas in Surabaya. Some of the important buildings in this area include Wisma BRI Surabaya, Hotel Bumi Surabaya, Wisma Dharmala Surabaya, The Peak Residence, and Sheraton Hotel.

Another cluster around Jalan Mayjend Sungkono, Jalan Adityawarman, Jalan HR Muhammad, and Jalan Bukit Darmo has grown as a new business center of the city. This area has now grown as one of the most rapidly growing commercial and business centers in East Java, with high-rise buildings. Some of the tallest buildings in Surabaya are located in this area, such as Adhiwangsa Apartment, Waterplace Residence, Puri Matahari, Beverly Park Apartment, The Via & The Vue Apartment, Ciputra World Hotel, Puncak Permai Apartment, and Rich Palace Hotel.

Retail 

Surabaya has plenty of shopping centers like other major cities of Indonesia, ranging from traditional markets to most modern shopping malls. Outlets of local and international brands have a presence in modern shopping malls. There were about 100 hectares/one million square metres of retail space in Surabaya by the end of 2016. There are many dedicated markets for electronic goods, gadgets and computer hardware.

Some important shopping malls of the city are:

 BG Junction
 Ciputra World Surabaya
 City of Tomorrow
 Royal Plaza Surabaya
 East Coast Center
 Galaxy Mall
 Grand City Mall
 HI-Tech Mall
 ITC Surabaya
 Lenmarc
 Marvell City
 Pakuwon Mall
 Pasar Atom Mall
 Tunjungan Plaza
 Surabaya Town Square
 World Trade Center Surabaya

Cityscapes

Infrastructure

Architecture 

Architecture in Surabaya is a mixture of colonial, Asian, Javanese, modern, and post-modern influences. There are many colonial-era relics still standing today, such as Hotel Majapahit and Surabaya Post Office. As a relatively old city in Indonesia and Southeast Asia, most colonial buildings were built around the 17th century to the early 20th century. These buildings show the influence of Dutch or European style in the Middle Ages.

Before the Second World War, there were many shophouses in the old part of the city, mostly two-storey. They display the influence of European and Chinese traditions. Although some have been dismantled for new construction, there are still many old buildings that are preserved as cultural heritage and city icons, which are around the area of Kembang Jepun Street, Karet Street, Gula Street, Slompretan Street, and Rajawali Street.

After the independence of Indonesia, the center of Surabaya's architectural development was concentrated only in the area of Jembatan Merah and its surroundings. In the late 1990s and early 2000s, modern and post-modern style buildings were increasingly emerging in Surabaya. Along with economic development, such buildings have continued to grow. In the 2010s, Surabaya has become a center of skyscrapers and high-rises in East Java and central regions of Indonesia, such as The Peak Residence – Tunjungan Plaza 6 (215 meters) and One Icon Residence – Tunjungan Plaza 5 (200 meters).

Important landmarks 

 Suramadu Bridge, which connect Surabaya to the nearby Madura island.
 Kebun Binatang Surabaya (Surabaya Zoo) opened in 1916. It was the first Zoo in the world to breed orangutans in captivity.
 Zheng He (Cheng Ho) Mosque, a recently built mosque, one of the unique mosques with Chinese-style architecture in Indonesia. Dedicated to the Hui Chinese diplomat, Zheng He.
 Al-Akbar Mosque, the largest mosque in East Java.
 Church of the Birth of Our Lady, Surabaya, one of the first churches to be built in Indonesia, and the first one ever built in East Java.
 Graha Bethany Nginden, is a megachurch which is one of the largest churches in Surabaya, Indonesia and Southeast Asia.
There is a museum on location as well, exhibiting reminders of the struggle for independence.
 Museum Nahdlatul Ulama, the resource center of the culture and history of Nahdlatul Ulama, an independent Islamic religious organization.
 Museum Bank Indonesia, a bank museum occupying the former De Javasche Bank built in 1904.
 House of Sampoerna, a museum devoted to the history of clove cigarette (kretek) manufacturing in Indonesia, housed in Dutch colonial buildings dating to 1864.
 Jalesveva Jayamahe Monument, a large, admiral-like statue which commemorates the Indonesian Navy.
 Monkasel, abbreviated from Monumen Kapal Selam (Submarine Monument) A Soviet-built Whiskey class submarine (named KRI Pasopati (410)), first launched in 1952, served in the Indonesian Navy from 1962 until decommissioned in 1990. After its decommissioning, Pasopati was dismantled and transferred to its present site in 1996. The submarine was reassembled on the current site and opened as a museum and tourist attraction in 1998.
 Kenjeran Beach, located in the eastern of Surabaya, which also housed Sanggar Agung, a Chinese temple built over the sea.
 Market of the Chinese Tomb, last resting place of Han Bwee Kong, Kapitein der Chinezen, magnate, mandarin and landlord in Surabaya and East Java, and patriarch of the patrician Han family of Lasem
 Han Ancestral Hall, a historic house that serves as a memorial temple for the ancestors of the Han family of Lasem
 Tomb of Sunan Ampel
 Bungkul Park, one of the most visited urban parks in Surabaya.
 Wisma Intiland, a brutalist building in Downtown Surabaya.
 Museum Pendidikan Surabaya

Military establishment 
The Eastern Fleet, one of three fleets in the Indonesian Navy, is headquartered in the city's Soerabaja Naval Base. Its maritime heritage is also represented in the form of KRI Pasopati Submarine Monument, a retired Russian Whiskey class submarine.

Transportation 

Transportation in Surabaya is supported by land and sea infrastructure serving local, regional, and international journeys. Air transport is located at Juanda Airport, at Sedati, Sidoarjo. Intracity transport is primarily by motor vehicles, motorcycles and taxis with limited public bus transport available. Recently Surabaya has been declared as the city with the worst congestion in Indonesia, according to a survey

Surabaya is also a transit city between Jakarta and Bali for ground transportation. Another bus route is between Jakarta and the neighboring island of Madura. In 2018, President Joko Widodo inaugurated final segments of the Trans-Java Toll Road, fully connecting Jakarta and Surabaya with expressways.

Airport 
Surabaya's Juanda International Airport is a passenger and cargo airport which also serves as Surabaya's Navy Airbase, operated by the TNI-AL (Indonesian Navy) and located just outside Surabaya, on the outskirts of Sidoarjo. This airport has served Surabaya for many years and currently has two terminals, with domestic flights served from Terminal 1 and all international flights and Garuda Indonesia's domestic flights serviced from Terminal 2.

Seaport 

Port of Tanjung Perak is the trading port in East Java and is one of the busiest ports in the country.
It is the second-largest port of trade, container and passenger traffic in Indonesia after the Port of Tanjung Priok in Jakarta. There is also Teluk Lamong Port Terminal, which is the main buffer terminal of Tanjung Perak Port. The port terminal of Lamong Bay is the first green port in Indonesia and is one of the most sophisticated port terminals in the world where the entire operating system is automated.

Train 

Surabaya has three major train stations, being Surabaya Kota (also known as Semut), Surabaya Pasar Turi, and Surabaya Gubeng. The Argo Bromo Anggrek operated by Kereta Api Indonesia (KAI) connects Surabaya from Surabaya Pasar Turi Station to Gambir Station in Jakarta. Both economy and executive class trains are served to and from Surabaya.

Commuter trains in the city has 5 separate lines (as of 2021) that connect Surabaya with surrounding regencies. Their services, also operated by KAI, have extended into Lamongan, Mojokerto, Sidoarjo, and Pasuruan.

It was opened in 1889 and closed by PJKA (former name of KAI) in 1978. There are plans to reopen the network in the future.

Surabaya MRT (planned) with Track Gauge Standard  and from KOICA Railways Mass transit in Surabaya, Surabaya MRT with Rolling stock Hyundai Rotem, Rapid transit Jakarta and Surabaya corridor. System Mass Metro Rapid transit in Greater Surabaya (Surabaya, Gresik and Sidoarjo) on the Generation surabaya mass rapid transit with track gauge  in Korea Rapid Transit from prime minister Chung Sye-kyun, of Eri Cahyadi Mayor of the Surabaya City of Rail Transport in Indonesia-Korea.

Bus 

The main bus terminal is Terminal Purabaya (located in Bungurasih, Waru, Sidoarjo), the other major terminal is Osowilangon in Tambak.

In Surabaya it is served by city buses as a means of choice for residents of Surabaya and surrounding cities for their daily activities. Surabaya has a number of terminals in the city, including Joyoboyo Terminal, Bratang Terminal, Jembatan Merah Bus Stop, Ujung Baru Bus Stop, and so on. These terminals are meeting points between city buses and other modes of transportation within the city.

Since April 7, 2018, the Surabaya city government has launched a city bus system named Suroboyo Bus which serves important points throughout the city. The Suroboyo Bus payment system is very unique because it uses plastic waste and makes Surabaya the second city in the world to implement this system in mass transportation after the Beijing subway in 2014. Suroboyo Bus has small stops scattered throughout the city.

Public transport 
There are various kinds of local transport, including taxi-cabs, Suroboyo Bus, shuttle bus service, city bus, angkot, and commuter rail. Go-Jek and Grab are also available throughout the city.

Infrastructure 

Until 2009, the growth of road length in Surabaya was only about 0.01% per year. This is not comparable to the growth of motorized vehicles which reaches around 7–8% annually. Congestion that occurred in Surabaya was triggered by the growth of vehicles that were not proportional to the capacity of the road. To reduce congestion, the city government has built many new roads, including the construction of a frontage road on Ahmad Yani road which is divided into east and west sides of 4 km each. This slow lane is planned to penetrate to the Buduran area, Sidoarjo Regency. In addition, the city government has completed the construction of the Middle East Ring Road (MERR), which is a 10.98 km ring road between the Kenjeran area to Tambak Sumur that connects the Suramadu Bridge and Juanda International Airport; and the 780-meter Suroboyo Bridge that crosses the sea which is now a tourist icon in the Kenjeran Beach area. The city government has also intensified the construction of massive box culverts in Surabaya to reduce congestion while anticipating flooding.

The Surabaya city government is also working on the construction of two new ring roads, namely the 17 km Outer East Ring Road (OERR) between the Kenjeran area to Gunung Anyar which also connects the Suramadu Bridge and Juanda International Airport and the West Outer Ring Road ( West Outer Ring Road (WORR) along 26.1 km between the Romokalisari area to Lakarsantri which connects the southern area of Surabaya with Teluk Lamong Harbor Terminal. In addition to building the ring road, the city government has completed the construction of an underpass on Jalan Mayjen Sungkono, and plans to build an underpass and flyover on Jalan Ahmad Yani. The problem of flooding is also a serious threat to city residents. To anticipate the occurrence of flooding, the city government has built many pump houses spread across several points in Surabaya, including Mulyorejo and Jemursari. In addition to pump houses, the city government has also built many parks that are used as sources of water absorption as well as areas for residents to interact, as well as carry out intensive cleaning and maintenance of major rivers in Surabaya. To accommodate the needs of pedestrians and tourists, the Surabaya city government has built bicycle lanes on many protocol roads in Surabaya, as well as pedestrian paths that are almost evenly distributed throughout the Surabaya area.

Toll Roads 

The toll roads that are connected to Surabaya are the Surabaya-Gresik segment which connects Surabaya with Gresik and cities on the north coast of Java, Surabaya-Mojokerto which connects Surabaya with the western part of East Java, Surabaya-Gempol which connects Surabaya with the southern part of East Java. , as well as Waru-Juanda Airport which connects Surabaya with Juanda International Airport. The Surabaya-Gempol section is connected to the Gempol-Pandaan section. The Gempol-Pandaan section is connected to the Gempol-Pasuruan section which connects Surabaya with the Horseshoe area in East Java and the Pandaan-Malang section which connects Surabaya with Malang, the second largest city in East Java and the southern part of East Java.

The Suramadu Bridge (derived from Surabaya-Madura) connects Surabaya and Madura Island over the Madura Strait. A  highway has been proposed to be built from the Suramadu Bridge to Madura International Seaport-City in Pernajuh village, Kocah district, Bangkalan, Madura at the cost of approximately Rp. 60 billion (US$7 billion). This container port was built to ease the burden on Surabaya's overloaded Tanjung Perak Port.

Education

Universities and post-secondary institutions 
Surabaya has several major universities and institutions, including those with religious or technical specialties (sorted by importance):
 Universitas Airlangga (UNAIR), a major public research university in Indonesia based in Surabaya and Banyuwangi.

 Universitas 17 Agustus 1945 (Untag) Surabaya, one of the oldest private universities in Surabaya.
 Institut Teknologi Sepuluh Nopember (ITS), a major public technological institute teaches robotics and mechanics, and is the center of Ship and Ocean Structure Design to support offshore exploration.

 State University of Surabaya (UNESA), a major university educating teachers; also with programs in Economics, Technology, and Law.
 Universitas Kristen Petra, a major Christian private university in Indonesia, with programs in Economics, Technology, Designs, Technical, Literature and Education. Established in 1961, it is the oldest major Christian university in Indonesia.
 Electronic Engineering Polytechnic Institute of Surabaya (PENS-PPNS), a major technical public institution located in Surabaya.
 Hang Tuah University, a university managed by Yayasan Nala, founded by the Indonesian Navy.
 Universitas Bhayangkara, a university affiliated with the Indonesian Police Department of East Java.
 Institut Sains Terapan dan Teknologi Surabaya, a private institute specializing in electronics, computer technologies, and communication and product design.
 Universitas Pembangunan Nasional "Veteran" Jawa Timur, a public institute in Surabaya.
 Adhi Tama Institute of Technology Surabaya, an institute specializing in Technical Studies.
 State Islamic University of Sunan Ampel (UINSA), a public university for Islamic studies.
 University of Surabaya, a private university teaching Pharmacy and Psychology, established in 1968.
 Wijaya Putra University a public University established in 1984.
 Wijaya Kusuma University Surabaya, a university which is the oldest private faculty of medicine in eastern Indonesia. Established in 1981, the Faculty of Medicine was founded in 1986.
 Widya Mandala Catholic University, a Catholic private university in Surabaya with facilities for Healthcare Studies at a newly opened third campus in the eastern part of the city. Widya Mandala Catholic University one of the Catholic oldest private universities in Surabaya which was established in 1960.
 Widya Kartika Catholic University, a Catholic private university in Surabaya.
 Pelita Harapan University, a private university in Indonesia founded in 1994.
 Ciputra University, a private entrepreneurial-oriented university founded in 2006 by the Ciputra Group.
 Narotama University (UNNAR), a private university in Surabaya.
 Muhammadiyah University of Surabaya (UM Surabaya), an Islamic private university established in 1964.

Primary and secondary schools 

International schools include:
 Surabaya Intercultural School
 Surabaya Japanese School (スラバヤ日本人学校)
 Surabaya Taipei International School; 印尼泗水臺灣學校)
 Surabaya European School
 Merlion school

Private schools include:
 Petra Christian School
 St. Louis Catholic School
 St. Agnes Catholic School
 Angelus Custos Catholic School
 GLORIA Christian School
 IPH Christian School
 JAC School
 Xin Zhong School (新中三语学校)

Cuisine 

As a metropolitan city, all types of Indonesian cuisine and other international restaurants have a presence. However, as the capital of East Java, cuisines from the rest of the province dominate the culinary culture of the city. East Javanese cuisines include a variety of processed fruits, crispy tempeh, Bakpao telo, Bakso Malang, Rawon, tahu campur lamongan, Cwie noodles, tahu takwa, tahu pong, getuk pisang, pecel madiun, wingko, tape, nasi krawu, otak-otak bandeng, bonggolan, shrimp crackers, shrimp paste or petis, Tempeh Chips, tahu tepo, Nasi lethok, sego tempong, salad soup, pecel rawon, Suwar-suwir, tape proll, gaplek, lodho, goat satay, and pecel tulungagung.

Surabaya is famous for Rawon, Rujak cingur, Semanggi, Lontong Balap, clams satay, mussels, and rice cake.
 Rujak cingur: a marinated cow snout or lips and noses (cingur), served with boiled vegetables and shrimp crackers. It is then dressed in a sauce made of caramelised fermented shrimp paste (petis), peanuts, chili, and spices. It is usually served with lontong, a boiled rice cake. Rujak cingur is considered traditional food of Surabaya.
 Rawon: a dark beef soup, served with mung bean sprouts and the ubiquitous sambal. The dark (almost black) color comes from the kluwak (Pangium edule) nuts.
 Lontong kupang: lontong with small cockles in petis sauce.
 Semanggi: a salad made of boiled semanggi (Marsilea crenata) leaves that grow in paddy fields. It is dressed in a spicy peanut sauce. It is usually eaten with rice crackers.

Sports 

Surabaya is a barometer and center of association football development in Indonesia. The city has many association football clubs founded in Surabaya. The first club was founded by the youth of Hoogere Burger School (HBS) John Edgar with the Victoria club in 1895. Others included Scoren Is Ons Doel (SIOD), Sparta, Rapiditas and Thot Heil Onzer Ribben (THOR). These are the pioneers of association football in Surabaya. The clubs then took management under Oost Java Voetbalbond (OJVB) in 1907. Two years later, the OJVB changed to Soerabajasche Voetbalbond (SVB). Starting in 1914, SVB was based on the Nederlandsch Indische Voetbalbond (NIVB), created by Dutch football federation (KNVB). The Surabaya Chinese and native people also founded their association football clubs by ethnicity. Oei Kwie Liem founded Hoa Soerabaja in 1914, while the Bumiputera through R Pamoedji and Paidjo founded the Soerabajasche Indonesische Voetbalbond (SIVB) on 18 June 1927 (now Persebaya), which three years later co-founded the PSSI.

In 1950, the working-class people and office men founded Soerabajasche Kantoor Voetbalbond (SKVB). The association football sector in Indonesia and specifically Surabaya became more developed, and the football association of Indonesia founded a semi-professional competition in 1979, which was named the Main Football League (Galatama). A new team emerged from Surabaya, NIAC Partners and the Salim Group Association. Besides Galatama, PSSI also formed a women's soccer competition called the Women's Football League (Galanita). Surabaya also has a women's soccer team, which was founded in 1977 and named Puteri Puspita. Clubs from Surabaya have also gained attention from the rest of the world. Persebaya has competed against European teams including Lokomotiv Moscow, Sturm Graz, Grasshoppers, Salzburg, Stade de Reims, Ajax Amsterdam, PSV Eindhoven, AC Milan, and lastly, Queens Park Rangers (QPR). Aside from European teams, there are several national teams outside the country competing against Persebaya, including Yugoslavia Olympics, Malaysia, Mozambique, Uruguay, Thailand, South Korea, and the Japanese national team.

NIAC Mitra also competed against Arsenal and won the Aga Khan Gold Cup competition in 1979 in Bangladesh. The achievements of NIAC Mitra in the Galatama competition included three championships in 1980–1982, 1982–1983, and 1987–1988, and finishing as runners-up in 1988–89. However, NIAC Partners officially dissolved and withdrew from the Galatama competition held by PSSI in 1990 because they considered the policies issued by PSSI irrelevant. After being disbanded, the demands of the Surabaya community to revive the NIAC Partners were channelled when the Jawa Pos party weighed in and changed the name of the NIAC Partner to the Surabaya Partner. When the Union competition was merged with Galatama in 1994, the new Persebaya was able to win in 1997 and 2004. Persebaya was listed as the first team capable of winning the Indonesian League twice. Mitra Surabaya was only able to exist until the 1998–1999 season and it was re-established again in another city, Tenggarong and has not used the name of Surabaya again.

Recently, only Persebaya has stable fans and achievements. Persebaya has won the Indonesian Premier Division three times–twice when the division was the first tier and once as the second tier. Fans refer to themselves as Bonek, an abbreviation for Bondo Nekat (which translates as "equipped by bravery"). The city is the home of CLS Knights Indonesia, a basketball club which participated in IBL (Indonesia basketball league) & Asean Basketball League.

Surabaya has a multi-purpose stadium, Gelora Bung Tomo Stadium.  The stadium is used mostly for football matches. It is the new home stadium of Persebaya, replacing Gelora 10 November Stadium. It was the venue of a match between Persebaya 1927 against then–English Premier League club Queens Park Rangers, held on 23 July 2012.

Another prevalent sport is badminton. There are numerous schools and clubs in the city that train students of various ages to reach the next level of the Badminton League. Many children start out their career from Surabaya and have made it to the national and sometimes international level.

Media 

One of the largest circulating national newspapers in Indonesia, Jawa Pos, is headquartered in Surabaya; alongside its media conglomerate Jawa Pos Group. Major newspapers include Surabaya Pagi and Surya.

Surabaya is served by many radio and television networks. Radio networks affiliates include the public RRI Surabaya, Gen FM Surabaya and Prambors FM Surabaya; as well as local stations Suara Surabaya and Radio Istara. Local television stations include the public 1suara Jawa Timur, JTV (both are regional stations serving East Java, which are based in the city), SBO TV, Surabaya TV and Nahdlatul Ulama-affiliated TV9.

International relations

Diplomatic Missions

General Consulates 
 Australian Consulate-General, Surabaya
 Chinese Consulate-General, Surabaya
 Consulate-General of Japan, Surabaya
 Consulate General of the United States, Surabaya

Consulates 

 Austria
 Belarus
 Belgium
 Czech Republic
 Denmark
 East Timor
 Finland
 France
 Germany
 Hungary
 India
 Mongolia
 Netherlands
 New Zealand
 Philippines
 Poland
 Russia
 Slovakia
 Sri Lanka
 Switzerland
 Sri Lanka
 Sweden
 Thailand
 United Kingdom

Other diplomatic offices 
 Taiwan (Taipei Economic and Trade Office in Surabaya)

Twin towns – sister cities

Surabaya is twinned with:

  Seattle, United States (1992)
  Busan, South Korea (1994)
  Kōchi, Japan (1997)
  Monterrey, Mexico (2001)
  Guangzhou, China (2005)
  Xiamen, China (2008)
  Varna, Bulgaria (2010)
  Liverpool, United Kingdom (2017)
  New Delhi, India (2021)
  Shah Alam, Malaysia
  Kaoshiung, Taiwan
  Alexandria, Egypt
  Johor Bahru, Malaysia
  Kuala Belait, Brunei

Notable people

See also 

 Colonial architecture of Surabaya
 List of tallest buildings in Surabaya

References

Citations

Bibliography

External links 

 
 
 
 

 
Populated places in East Java
Populated coastal places in Indonesia
Provincial capitals in Indonesia